Fan Qin (1506 - 1585, courtesy name: Yaoqing (堯卿), pseudonym: Dongming (東明)) was a politician and bibliophile of the Ming Dynasty.

Born in Ningbo in 1506, Fan Qin succeeded in the highest level of the Imperial examination in 1532 and obtained jinshi degree. In 1560, he was appointed right vice-minister of war (兵部右侍郎) under the Jiajing Emperor. Later, he resigned because of the dissatisfaction to Yan Song, the corrupt chancellor.

In 1561, Fan Qin founded Tianyi Chamber in Ningbo city, which is now the oldest existing library in China.

References

  清光绪《鄞县志·范钦传》

1506 births
1585 deaths
Ming dynasty politicians
Chinese bibliophiles
Politicians from Ningbo
Chinese librarians